Carisbamate (YKP 509, proposed trade name Comfyde) is an experimental anticonvulsant drug that was under development by Johnson & Johnson Pharmaceutical Research and Development but never marketed.

Clinical study
A phase II clinical trial in the treatment of partial seizures demonstrated that the compound has efficacy in the treatment of partial seizures and a good safety profile. Since late 2006, the compound has been undergoing a large multicenter phase III clinical trial for the treatment of partial seizures.  Its mechanism of action is unknown.

A double-blind, placebo-controlled trial of carisbamate in 323 patients with migraine determined that carisbamate was well tolerated at doses up to 600 mg/day, but it failed to demonstrate that the drug was sufficiently more effective than placebo in migraine prophylaxis.

History
In 1998, the compound was in-licensed from SK Corp. (currently Life Science Business Division of SK Holdings), a South Korean company.  On October 24, 2008, Johnson & Johnson announced that it had submitted a New Drug Application to the U.S. Food and Drug Administration (FDA) for carisbamate.  Johnson & Johnson received provisional approval by the FDA to market carisbamate under the brand name of Comfyde. However, on August 21, 2009, Johnson & Johnson reported that the FDA had failed to give marketing approval.

References

Anticonvulsants
Carbamates
Secondary alcohols
Chloroarenes
Johnson & Johnson brands
GABAA receptor positive allosteric modulators
Abandoned drugs